The 1944 Saint Mary's Gaels football team was an American football team that represented Saint Mary's College of California during the 1944 college football season. In their third season under head coach James Phelan, the Gaels compiled a 0–5 record and were outscored by opponents by a combined total of 148 to 14.

Schedule

References

Saint Mary's
Saint Mary's Gaels football seasons
Saint Mary's Gaels football